Adam Docker (born 24 January 1991) is an Australian former professional rugby league footballer.

Background
Born in Shellharbour, New South Wales, Docker played his junior rugby league for the Shellharbour Sharks, before being signed by the St. George Illawarra Dragons.

Playing career

Early career
In 2010 and 2011, Docker played for the St. George Illawarra Dragons' NYC team, scoring 2 tries in 14 games.

2012
In 2012, Docker joined the Penrith Panthers, playing with their New South Wales Cup team, Windsor Wolves, for most of the year. In Round 24 of the 2012 NRL season, he made his NRL debut for Penrith in their 18-16 win over the New Zealand Warriors at Mount Smart Stadium.

2014
On 4 May, Docker played for New South Wales Country against New South Wales City in the 2014 City vs Country Origin match. On 29 September, he was named in the Australian train-on squad for the 2014 Rugby League Four Nations.

2015
In January 2015, Docker attended the Emerging Origin Blues squad designed for possible future New South Wales State of Origin representatives. After managing to only play one game in the 2015 season, he was forced to retire at the end of the season due to no cartilage left in his left knee leaving him with high grade arthritis.

Personal life
In 2011, Docker was placed into an induced coma after arriving at St George Hospital's Intensive Care Unit following a bashing on the streets of Cronulla by a gang of teenagers.

References

External links

2015 Penrith Panthers profile

1991 births
Living people
Australian rugby league players
Country New South Wales Origin rugby league team players
Penrith Panthers players
Shellharbour City Dragons players
Rugby league locks
Rugby league players from New South Wales
Rugby league second-rows
Windsor Wolves players